3850 Peltier, provisional designation , is a Florian asteroid and suspected interloper from the inner regions of the asteroid belt, approximately 4 kilometers in diameter. It was discovered on 7 October 1986, by American astronomer Edward Bowell at Lowell's Anderson Mesa Station, near Flagstaff, Arizona. The asteroid was named after American amateur astronomer Leslie Peltier.

Orbit and classification 

In the SMASS taxonomy, Peltier is a V-type asteroid but possesses the orbital characteristics of a member of the Flora family, which is one of the largest groups of stony S-type asteroids in the main-belt. It is therefore thought to be an unrelated interloper that does not origin from the Flora family's parent body. Peltier orbits the Sun in the inner main-belt at a distance of 1.9–2.6 AU once every 3 years and 4 months (1,220 days). Its orbit has an eccentricity of 0.16 and an inclination of 5° with respect to the ecliptic.

Physical characteristics

Rotation period 

A rotational lightcurve of Peltier was obtained by Czech astronomer Petr Pravec at Ondřejov Observatory in October 2006. Lightcurve analysis gave a rotation period of 2.4287 hours with a brightness variation of 0.09 magnitude. In December 2013, photometric observations by Australian amateur astronomer Julian Oey gave a concurring period of 2.4289 hours and an amplitude of 0.10 magnitude.

Diameter and albedo 

Peltier has not been observed by any space-based surveys such as the Infrared Astronomical Satellite IRAS, the Japanese Akari satellite, or NASA's Wide-field Infrared Survey Explorer with its subsequent NEOWISE mission. The Collaborative Asteroid Lightcurve Link assumes a standard albedo for V-type asteroids of 0.40 and calculates a diameter of 4.00 kilometers using an absolute magnitude of 13.6.

Naming 

This minor planet was named in memory of American amateur astronomer Leslie Peltier (1900–1980), who has discovered 12 comets and several novae including Nova Herculis 1963. Naming citation was provided by David H. Levy and published by the MPC on 20 May 1989.

Notes

References

External links 
 Nova Herculis 1963, October 1963, SAO/NASA ADS Astronomy Abstract Service
 Asteroid Lightcurve Database (LCDB), query form (info )
 Dictionary of Minor Planet Names, Google books
 Asteroids and comets rotation curves, CdR – Observatoire de Genève, Raoul Behrend
 Discovery Circumstances: Numbered Minor Planets (1)-(5000) – Minor Planet Center
 
 

003850
Discoveries by Edward L. G. Bowell
Named minor planets
003850
19861007